South Brother is a mountain located in Piscataquis County, Maine, in Baxter State Park. South Brother is flanked to the southwest by Mount Coe, and to the northeast by North Brother; collectively the two are called "The Brothers".

South Brother stands within the watershed of the Penobscot River, which drains into Penobscot Bay. The northeast and southeast sides of South Brother drain into a swampy area called "The Klondike", then into Wassataquoik Stream, and the East Branch of the Penobscot River. The west sides of South Brother drain into Roaring Brook, Nesowadnehunk Stream, and the West Branch of the Penobscot River.

The Appalachian Trail, a  National Scenic Trail from Georgia to Maine, reaches it northern terminus, Mount Katahdin,  to the southeast of The Brothers.

See also 
 List of mountains of Maine
 List of New England Hundred Highest

References

New England Hundred Highest
Mountains of Piscataquis County, Maine
Mountains of Maine